

Medalists

Qualification

Qualification rule: qualification standard 4.55m or at least best 8 qualified

Final

Pole vault at the World Athletics Indoor Championships
Pole Vault Women
2008 in women's athletics